San Jorge Island is the second largest island in the Isabel Province, Solomon Islands.

Geography
The terrain elevation above sea level has been estimated at about 159 metres, but SRTM data shows a maximum elevation of about 470 metres. 
The island lies at the southern end of Santa Isabel Island and borders Thousand Ships Bay. The island possesses substantial nickel ore deposites, and international mining companies consider developing mining projects. Also, peridotites associated with pyroxenites, with rare olivine and spinel, are exposed on the island.

History
The first recorded sighting by Europeans was by the Spanish expedition of Álvaro de Mendaña on 21 April 1568. More precisely the sighting was due to a local voyage done by a small boat, in the accounts the brigantine Santiago, commanded by Maestre de Campo Pedro Ortega Valencia and having Hernán Gallego as pilot. They were who charted it with its present-day name, San Jorge, and also who named the narrow channel separating San Jorge from Santa Isabel Island as the Ortega channel after the commander of the expedition.

References

Islands of the Solomon Islands